The 1978–79 Bundesliga was the 16th season of the Bundesliga, West Germany's premier football league. It began on 11 August 1978 and ended on 9 June 1979. 1. FC Köln were the defending champions.

Competition modus
Every team played two games against each other team, one at home and one away. Teams received two points for a win and one point for a draw. If two or more teams were tied on points, places were determined by goal difference and, if still tied, by goals scored. The team with the most points were crowned champions while the three teams with the fewest points were relegated to their respective 2. Bundesliga divisions.

Team changes to 1978–79
TSV 1860 Munich, 1. FC Saarbrücken and FC St. Pauli were relegated to the 2. Bundesliga after finishing in the last three places during 1977–78. They were replaced by Arminia Bielefeld, winners of the 2. Bundesliga Northern Division, SV Darmstadt 98, winners of the Southern Division and 1. FC Nürnberg, who won a two-legged promotion play-off against Rot-Weiss Essen.

Season overview

Team overview

League table

Results

Top goalscorers
22 goals
  Klaus Allofs (Fortuna Düsseldorf)

21 goals
  Klaus Fischer (FC Schalke 04)

18 goals
  Rüdiger Abramczik (FC Schalke 04)

17 goals
  Kevin Keegan (Hamburger SV)
  Klaus Toppmöller (1. FC Kaiserslautern)

16 goals
  Dieter Hoeneß (VfB Stuttgart)
  Harald Nickel (Eintracht Braunschweig)

15 goals
  Manfred Burgsmüller (Borussia Dortmund)

14 goals
  Karl-Heinz Rummenigge (FC Bayern Munich)
  Georg Volkert (VfB Stuttgart)

Champion squad

See also
 1978–79 DFB-Pokal

References

External links
 DFB Bundesliga archive 1978/1979

Bundesliga seasons
1
Germany